Viktor Oleksandrovych Pozhechevskyi (born 4 February 1951 in Poltava, USSR) is a Ukrainian professional football player and manager.

Career
He was a footballer of the Silbud Poltava, but by high competition has not played any match.

In 1984, he started his coaching career in FC Vorskla Poltava. In 1998, he coached the Turkmenistan national football team. Also he was a coach of the Köpetdag Aşgabat. Later he coached FC Naftovyk-Ukrnafta Okhtyrka.

References

External links
 
 

1951 births
Living people
Sportspeople from Poltava
Ukrainian footballers
Soviet footballers
Association football defenders
FC Vorskla Poltava players
Ukrainian football managers
Ukrainian expatriate football managers
Soviet football managers
FC Vorskla Poltava managers
Ukrainian expatriate sportspeople in Turkmenistan
Expatriate football managers in Turkmenistan
Turkmenistan national football team managers
FK Köpetdag Aşgabat managers
FC Naftovyk Okhtyrka managers
Merited Coaches of Ukraine